Second Sergeant Usman bin Haji Muhammad Ali (18 March 1943 – 17 October 1968), also spelt Osman bin Haji Mohamed Ali, was an Indonesian marine and convicted murderer. He uses the aliases Janatin or Usman Janatin during his task of bombing the MacDonald House, which killed three people and injured 33 other people. Usman was executed alongside his accomplice Harun Said for the murders of the three deceased victims from the MacDonald House bombing.

Biography
Usman Haji Muhammad Ali was born in Jatisaba, Purbalingga, on 18 March 1943. He graduated from middle school in 1962.

On 1 June 1962, he entered the Indonesian Marine Corps, and was appointed as one of three volunteers to serve in the military operation Komando Siaga (later renamed Komando Mandala Siaga), led by Air Force Vice Admiral Omar Dhani, during the Indonesia-Malaysia confrontation. Usman was later stationed at Sambu Island, Riau.

Bombing of MacDonald House
On 10 March 1965, they targeted a civilian building, the Hong Kong and Shanghai Bank building (now the MacDonald House), killing three and wounding at least thirty-three, all civilians.

Capture and Conviction
Usman and Harun subsequently escaped to a beach, while Gani disappeared and presumably returned to Indonesia. After seizing a motorboat, which broke down at sea, they were rescued by another boat and subsequently handed over to the Singapore Marine Police on 13 March 1965. Initially claiming to be engaged in fishing, they were however arrested and interrogated by the local police.

Usman and Harun were convicted of murder as they had been wearing civilian clothes at the time and had targeted a civilian building; both men were sentenced to death by a Singapore court. The two were hanged in Changi Prison on 17 October 1968. Usman's remains were taken back to Indonesia and buried in Kalibata Heroes Cemetery, Jakarta.

National Heroes
They were awarded the status of Indonesian national heroes on 17 October 1968 (the same day they were hanged) and were posthumously promoted to one rank higher than those they held prior to their last operation.

KRI Usman-Harun (359)
In 2014, one of three ships of the Bung Tomo-class corvette of the Indonesian Navy (initially built for Brunei but later sold to Indonesia) was named after Usman and Harun as the KRI Usman-Harun (bearing the pennant number 359). The ship's name caused controversy between Indonesia and Singapore due to the bombing attack of 1965 and its immediate after-effects. Indonesia has not reversed its naming decision; in response, the Singapore government has banned the ship from entering its waters or docking in the country.

See also
 Indonesia–Malaysia confrontation
 Harun Thohir
 Capital punishment in Singapore
 MacDonald House bombing

References

Bibliography

1943 births
1968 deaths
Indonesian military personnel
National Heroes of Indonesia
20th-century executions by Singapore
Indonesian people executed abroad